Mutatocoptops annulicornis is a species of beetle in the family Cerambycidae. It was described by Heller in 1926, originally under the genus Saimia. It is known from the Philippines.

References

Mesosini
Beetles described in 1926